Catalent, Inc. (Catalent Pharma Solutions) is a multinational corporation headquartered in Somerset, New Jersey. It is a global provider of delivery technologies, development, drug manufacturing, biologics, gene therapies and consumer health products. It employs more than 14,000 people, including approximately 2,400 scientists and technicians. In fiscal year 2020, it generated over $3 billion in annual revenue.

Catalent was formed in April 2007 when affiliates of the Blackstone Group L.P. acquired the core of the pharmaceutical technologies and services (PTS) segment of Cardinal Health, Inc. Cardinal Health created PTS through a series of acquisitions starting with R.P. Scherer Corporation in 1998.

In 2014, Catalent became a public company, listed on the New York Stock Exchange.

History

Before 2007
In 1996, Cardinal Health acquired PCI (Headquarters: Philadelphia, Pennsylvania). PCI (Packaging Coordinators Inc.) is a pharmaceutical contract packing service for commercial and clinical packaging.

In 1998, Cardinal Health acquired R.P. Scherer Corporation (Headquarters: Troy, Michigan). Robert Pauli Scherer founded the R.P. Scherer Corporation to commercialize his innovation of softgel encapsulation using the rotary die production process. The following year, in 1999, Cardinal Health acquired Automatic Liquid Packaging, Inc. (Headquarters: Woodstock, Ill.), whose Blow-Fill-Seal Technology allowed Cardinal to enter the sterile product market.

In 2002, Cardinal Health acquired Magellan Laboratories Inc., a company that specialized in product development expertise. In 2003, Cardinal Health acquired Gala Biotech (Headquarters: Madison, Wisconsin). In the same year, Cardinal Health also acquired Intercare Group PLC, broadening its global capabilities in Europe.

From 2004 to 2006, Cardinal Health further expanded its reach in biotechnology and pharmaceutical markets through multiple acquisitions.

Formation of Catalent in 2007
In 2007, the pharmaceutical technologies and services segment of Cardinal Health was purchased by Blackstone Group and re-branded as Catalent Pharma Solutions.

After 2007 and initial public offering-2019
In 2012, Catalent acquired Aptuit, a clinical supply company. As part of the deal, Catalent gained three sites in the US, two in the UK, and one in Singapore. Catalent also acquired all remaining shares for the R.P Scherer site in Eberbach, Germany. In 2013, Catalent continued the global expansion of its Softgel capabilities through a joint venture with Zhejiang Jaing Yuan Tang Biotechnology Co, a China-based company, and Relthy Laboratories in Brazil.

Catalent announced its initial public offering in July 2014. After raising more than $870 million, Catalent became a publicly traded company on the New York Stock Exchange (NYSE). The company priced its 42.5 million shares of common stock at $20.50 apiece, with a market capitalization of $2.4 billion. The shares began trading on the NYSE on 31 July 2014, under the ticker symbol CTLT.

In November 2014, Catalent announced it had acquired Micron Technologies, a provider of particle size engineering technologies. The acquisition allowed Catalent to expand its portfolio of drug delivery technologies.

In 2016, Catalent licensed the anti-body drug conjugate (ADC) to Triphase Accelerator to help with oncology development, and bought Pharmatek Laboratories to add spray drying to their manufacturing capabilities. In September 2017, Catalent agreed to acquire Cook Pharmica for $950 million, allowing Catalent to expand their biologic manufacturing. In July 2018, Catalent extended their work with Juniper Pharmaceuticals with a $133 million deal.

Alessandro Maselli was appointed as president and chief operating officer in 2019, a newly created position within Catalent. In March, 2019, Catalent invested more than $27 million to commercialize Zydis Ultra. The investment includes new Zydis lines; changes to one of their facilities in Swindon, UK; and a custom suite for commercial equipment. Later in 2019, Catalent partnered with GB Sciences to develop a cannabinoid-derived medicine for Parkinson's disease utilizing the Zydis delivery method.

In April 2019, Catalent agreed to acquire Paragon Bioservices Inc for $1.2 billion to expand its gene-therapy manufacturing capabilities. The deal was completed in May 2019 and included an agreement with Sarepta Therapeutics, a gene therapy manufacturer. As of October 2019, Paragon's employee numbers have almost doubled since the April acquisition.

In June 2019, Catalent acquired Bristol-Myers' European launch pad to expand its global CDMO.

2020-present 
In January 2020, Catalent purchased a manufacturing facility located in Anagni, Italy, from Bristol-Myers Squibb, to manufacture and package biologic and oral solid dose products for multiple companies. In February 2020, Catalent agreed to acquire MaSTherCell, a Belgian gene and cell therapy manufacturer, for $315 million. The acquisition allows Catalent to expand into cell therapy development.

In 2020, Catalent partnered with multiple drugmakers, including Pfizer, Johnson & Johnson, AstraZeneca, and Moderna to provide manufacturing, vial filling and packaging capabilities for COVID-19 vaccine candidates. In the partnership with AstraZeneca, Catalent will provide manufacturing from its Maryland facility and vial filling and packaging from its Italian facility. Catalent also partnered with ViralClear to manufacture a COVID-19 treatment candidate at Catalent's St. Petersburg facility. Also in 2021, Catalent acquired German gene therapy development firm Rheincell Therapeutics.

In August 2021, Catalent announced plans to acquire nutritional supplement company Bettera Holdings LLC for $1 billion. The deal will allow Catalent to manufacture vitamins, minerals and supplements in gummy form.

In October 2021, Catalent opened a 6,000 square-meter clinical supply facility in Shiga, Japan.

In October 2022, Catalent announced a $12M expansion at a Kansas City, MO facility.

January 2023, Catalent partnered with Sarepta to manufacture delandistrogene moxeparvovec (SRP-9001). Sarepta's most advanced gene therapy candidate for the treatment of Duchenne muscular dystrophy (DMD).

Financials

References

External links

 

Companies based in Somerset County, New Jersey
Pharmaceutical companies established in 2007
Companies listed on the New York Stock Exchange
Pharmaceutical companies based in New Jersey
Gene therapy
Biotechnology companies of the United States
Multinational companies headquartered in the United States
Life sciences industry
Drug discovery companies
Research and development in the United States
2014 initial public offerings